The Conchos darter (Etheostoma australe) is a species of freshwater ray-finned fish, a darter from the subfamily Etheostomatinae, part of the family Percidae, which also contains the perches, ruffes and pikeperches. It is endemic to the Conchos River system in northern Mexico, where it is known as dardo de conchos. It occurs in clear water in areas of shallow, rocky riffles and poolswhere the bed consists of gravel, sand and silt. It can be found as deep as  where the current may vary from slight to strong. The Conchos darter feeds on the bottom of the streams it occurs in on aquatic insect larvae. It is thought that it spawns from late February until June, and it is able to survive water temperatures as high as  during the summer. The Conchos darter was first formally described in 1889 by the American ichthyologist David Starr Jordan (1851-1931) with the type locality given as the Río Chihuahua in Mexico.

References

Etheostoma
Endemic fish of Mexico
Freshwater fish of Mexico
Fish described in 1889
Taxa named by David Starr Jordan 
Taxonomy articles created by Polbot